Golconda No. 2 Precinct is located in Pope County, Illinois, USA.  As of the 2000 census, its population was 1,005.

Geography

References

Precincts in Pope County, Illinois